November 1981 is double album by American jazz trumpeter Bill Dixon consisting of one disc recorded live in Zurich and another in a studio in Milan in November 1981 and released on the Italian Soul Note label.

Reception

In his review for AllMusic, Bob Rusch states "The music on this two-record set was typical of trumpeter Bill Dixon's hue and perhaps the most in-command set of his so far released. The first five tracks on sides one and two... struck me as rather unresolved and tedious on first listening. The last four tracks on sides three and four... grabbed me with both their immediacy and daring. Both sides impressed me with the dedication to purity which has always marked all of Dixon's music. Repeated listenings to record number one brought out greater dimensions to the music, displaying an azure mellowness which ran deep with revolving panoramas."

The authors of The Penguin Guide to Jazz awarded the album four stars out of four, and wrote that it "may be considered Dixon's small-group masterpiece, patiently conceived and executed, and generously proportioned. Dixon likes to build his ideas around silence, but these statuesque themes also use rich drones provided by the bass player... As ever, the trumpet is used quite sparingly, with the opening 'Webern'... there to underline his use of the Klangfarbenmelodie device whereby different instruments play different parts of the line and in which timbre and colour are structural principles and not just decoration."

Writing for Rock Salted, Syd Fablo commented: "On the whole, this music is characterized by each player making independent contributions that work together.  Likely as not, at any given time there are multiple solos occurring simultaneously, without any player relegated to 'accompaniment' as such. The results are dense, but given the way the doubling up of bassists makes this sound almost like a trio, it is not overpowering.  The recording fidelity is very good, minimalistic with a deep low end and an almost ominous feeling... Dixon had worked toward the sound employed here for some time, and these performances might be considered the culmination of that effort... November 1981 is definitely a highlight in Dixon's discography, and one of the more interesting and unique offerings in 1980s jazz."

Musician Taylor Ho Bynum bought November 1981 while in his late teens, and recalled: "I took it home, put it on my stereo, and within the one minute and twenty six seconds of the opening solo trumpet track ('Webern'), I realized that I had to completely rethink the possibilities of the trumpet as an improvising instrument. For me, November 1981 counts in the small handful of recordings that gave me truly revelatory listening experiences... November 1981 probably was the most specifically influential upon me as an instrumentalist. While I certainly hope my own playing, particularly since I switched to cornet, does not explicitly copy Dixon's approach, I must acknowledge the way his sound (along with Don Cherry, Wadada Leo Smith, etc) expanded the basic palette and vocabulary available to any modern improvising brass musician... The album effortlessly moves from intense, sound-oriented timbral improvisation to gorgeous, breathtaking lyricism, from bubbling, rhythmic two-bass energy to magical moments of droning, suspended time. It perfectly balances many of the contrasts that Dixon has been dealing with throughout his career. It sounds completely improvised, yet wholly composed; it has moments of shock and beauty, time and no-time, harmony and freedom."

Track listing
All compositions by Bill Dixon
Side A:
 "November 1981" -10:40
 "Penthesilea" -10:10
Side B:
 "The Second Son" - 5:10
 "The Sirens" - 7:05
 "Another Quiet Feeling" - 6:48
Side C:
 Announcement" - 1:13 omitted from CD rerelease
 "Webern" - 1:24
 "Windswept Winterset" -15:42Side D: "Velvet" - 6:44
 "Llaattiinnoo Suite" -15:24
 Announcement'' - 1:40 omitted from CD rerelease
Sides A & B recorded November 16 & 17, 1981, at Barigozzi Studios, Milano, Italy. Sides C & D recorded live November 8, 1981, at Volkshaus, Zürich, Switzerland. The CD rerelease omits the stage announcements and programs the live tracks first.

Personnel
Bill Dixon - trumpet
Mario Pavone, Alan Silva - bass
Laurence Cook - drums

References 

1982 albums
Bill Dixon albums
Black Saint/Soul Note albums